Pálmi Jónsson (born 11 November 1929 – 9 October 2017) was an Icelandic politician and former minister.

References

1929 births
Palmi Jonsson
2017 deaths
Place of birth missing